Enyu (Bulgarian: Еню) is a masculine given name that may refer to
Emperor En'yū (959–991), Emperor of Japan 
Enyu Todorov (born 1943), Bulgarian wrestler 
Enyu Valchev (1936–2014), Bulgarian wrestler 
Wu Enyu (1909–1979), Chinese philosopher, political scientist and literary critic

Bulgarian masculine given names
Chinese masculine given names